Seven Years (1998–2005) is a DVD released in 2005 by German producer and DJ ATB. It was also released in a special edition with the Seven Years: 1998-2005 CD.

As the title says, the DVD features all his music videos from 1998 to 2005, a photo gallery, the making of the "I Don't Wanna Stop" video, an interview, and many more specials.

Track listing

Videos
 "9pm (Till I Come)"
 "Don't Stop"
 "Killer"
 "The Summer"
 "The Fields of Love"
 "Let U Go"
 "Hold You
 "You're Not Alone"
 "I Don't Wanna Stop"
 "Long Way Home"
 "Marrakech"
 "Ecstasy"
 "Believe In Me"
 "Humanity" (Special Bonus Video "ATB in Concert")

Inside
 ATB interview

Gallery
 ATB photo gallery

Special
 ATB - The Making of "I Don't Wanna Stop" video

Bonus
 Bonus Video - "Believe In Me" (Airplay Version)

ATB video albums
2005 video albums
Music video compilation albums
2005 compilation albums